Frida Waage Amundsen (born 9 September 1992) is a Norwegian singer and songwriter from Vaksdal.

In autumn 2009, she signed a recording contract with EMI, the debut album September Blue was released in 2012. The debut single "Closer" was released 20 May 2011. with considerable airplay on Norwegian radio stations. The song was written and produced by Lars K. Hustoft of Crystal Air Music and by Yngve Highland. Frida Amundsen has since climbed the charts in Germany, Italy, Austria, Switzerland, Sweden, Finland and Denmark.

Discography

Albums

Singles

Featured in

References

1992 births
Living people
21st-century Norwegian singers
21st-century Norwegian women singers
People from Vaksdal